The City Congregation for Humanistic Judaism, founded in 1991, is the only Humanistic Jewish congregation in Manhattan, and the first Humanistic congregation in New York City to be led by a Humanistic rabbi. The aim of The City Congregation is to provide a welcoming, diverse community for cultural and secular Jews where they can celebrate and preserve their Jewish identity.   As adherents of Humanistic Judaism, founded in 1963 by Rabbi Sherwin Wine, TCC members rely on reason, inner strength, and the support of community to face life's challenges and collectively improve the world.

TCC members come from throughout the New York metropolitan area and do not claim one specific neighborhood.  While they reside predominantly in Manhattan and Brooklyn, they also live in Queens and the Bronx, as well as Westchester, Long Island and New Jersey. The congregation meets for Shabbats at a convenient Midtown location. For adult and child learning, they meet on the Upper West Side, and for High Holidays and Passover they meet in Midtown West.

The City Congregation is an affiliated community of the Society for Humanistic Judaism, which was organized in 1969 and comprises more than thirty secular Jewish communities in the United States and Canada.

Celebrations
The City Congregation offers cultural High Holiday and Shabbat celebrations throughout the year.  A highlight is the congregation's cultural Passover Seder.  Based on the idea that Jewish culture has always been changing, the congregation's services adapt old traditions to modern sensibilities and use language that is consistent with humanistic principles.

KidSchool
Twice-monthly KidSchool is designed to foster joy in the children's Jewish education and nurture a cultural connection to their Jewish heritage.  The curriculum introduces the students to the principles, beliefs and practices of Humanistic Judaism and develops cultural literacy in Jewish heritage, holidays, literature, and history. In keeping with humanistic values and principles of progressive education, the students are encouraged to develop critical thinking and healthy skepticism in an atmosphere of respectful and open discussion.

Cultural Bar/Bat Mitzvah
A highlight of the program is the Bar Mitzvah or Bat Mitzvah program, for grades six and up, through which children are mentored and guided in the process by adult members of the congregation.  The children investigate their family history and values, heroes and role models, their own beliefs, and complete a major project on any topic of Jewish learning they want to explore in depth. A social action component is also included. The Bar/Bat Mitzvah service is a joyful experience, filled with readings and songs, and a presentation of the exciting work the student has completed throughout the program.

Other activities
The congregation also offers an array of other programs.  Social action activities are designed to address contemporary social challenges and increase awareness of these issues.  Social outings take advantage of the wonderful cultural offerings in New York City and foster a feeling of community and connection among members.

Rabbis
The leader of The City Congregation, is Rabbi Dr. Tzemah Yoreh, one the intellectual leaders of Jewish humanism. He has been a student of the Bible since his earliest days, winning the Diaspora Division of the International Bible Contest in childhood. He attended the Hebrew University of Jerusalem, where he obtained his Ph.D. in biblical criticism in record time. He has recently completed a second Ph.D. in Ancient Wisdom Literature at the University of Toronto for the joy of studying ancient text.

Rabbi Yoreh is a prolific writer and his humanist liturgy has been featured in The Forward in an article entitled “No God, No Problem”. He wrote, in Hebrew, an Atheist-Feminist Siddur. More recently he is the author of the Humanist Prayer Omnibus, which re-imagines prayer as a catalyst for human-driven change rather than communication with a deity.  As a writer he is perhaps best known for his theories on why Abraham killed Isaac, featured in The Times of Israel and thetorah.com.

Rabbi Emeritus, Rabbi Peter Schweitzer, is a recognized leader of Humanistic Judaism. He served as the president of the Association of Humanistic Rabbis and is a member of the Editorial Board of the journal Humanistic Judaism. He also contributes the Humanistic perspective to Moment Magazine's "Ask the Rabbi" column.  Among his writings are: The Liberated Haggadah:  A Passover Celebration for Cultural, Secular and Humanistic Jews (The Center for Cultural Judaism, 2006), The Guide for a Humanistic Bar/Bat Mitzvah (The City Congregation for Humanistic Judaism, 2003), and A Modern Lamentation:  A Memorial to 9/11 (The City Congregation for Humanistic Judaism, Rosh Hashanah, 2002).

Rabbi Schweitzer is also recognized for the major collection of Jewish Americana that he amassed over twenty-five years.  Numbering some 10,000 items, he donated this major collection in 2005 to The National Museum of American Jewish History in Philadelphia.  Rabbi Schweitzer's dedication to social service and Jewish causes comes from a long tradition of family commitment. He is the great-grandson of the renowned constitutional lawyer and Jewish civic leader, Louis Marshall, and the grandson of Jacob Billikopf, the nationally recognized leader in social work, Jewish philanthropy and labor negotiation.

See also
Secular Jewish culture
Humanistic Judaism
Society for Humanistic Judaism
Sherwin Wine
Moment Magazine
Louis Marshall
Jacob Billikopf
Center for Cultural Judaism

References

External links
Official website

Humanistic synagogues in New York City
Jewish organizations established in 1991
Secular Jewish culture in the United States
Synagogues in Manhattan
1991 establishments in New York City